Caledonia Historic District  is a national historic district located at Caledonia, Washington County, Missouri.  It encompasses 33 in the central business district and surrounding residential sections of Caledonia.  It developed between about 1818 and  1936 and includes representative examples of Greek Revival and Neoclassical style architecture.  Notable buildings include the Ruggles-Evans-Dent house (c. 1830), Conoco service station (c. 1930), Tyro Masonic Lodge (1919), Eversole House (1854), Post office (c. 1909), Benton Sinclair store (c. 1909), McSpaden's Golden Rule Store (c. 1909), Methodist Church (c. 1852), Presbyterian Church (1872), and Caledonia School (1936).

It was listed on the National Register of Historic Places in 1986.

References

Historic districts on the National Register of Historic Places in Missouri
Greek Revival architecture in Missouri
Neoclassical architecture in Missouri
Buildings and structures in Washington County, Missouri
National Register of Historic Places in Washington County, Missouri